Typhoon Nari, known in the Philippines as Typhoon Santi, was a strong and deadly tropical cyclone that first struck Luzon before striking Vietnam. The storm was the 41st depression and the 8th typhoon in the 2013 typhoon season. Typhoon Nari was a deadly typhoon that made landfall in the Philippines and Vietnam.

Meteorological history

The system was subsequently named Santi by the Philippine Atmospheric, Geophysical and Astronomical Services Administration (PAGASA) as it moved along the southern edge of a subtropical ridge of high pressure.

Later that day the United States Joint Typhoon Warning Center (JTWC) initiated advisories on the system and designated it as Tropical Depression 24W after the systems low level circulation center had started to consolidate.

During the next day after central convection over the systems low level circulation centre had increased both the JMA and the JTWC reported that the depression had developed into a tropical storm, with the latter naming it as Nari. Nari ensued a period of rapid intensification in the Philippine Sea, with the Japan Meteorological Agency and PAGASA upgrading the system into a typhoon. Nari became a Category 3 as it smashed ashore into Dingalan, Aurora. Power outages affected much of Central Luzon as the typhoon crossed the region. Five people were killed by falling trees and landslides from Nari as it weakened to a Category 2 typhoon on October 12. 
Within the Philippines a total of 15 people were left dead while 5 were missing, while total economic losses were amounted to be Php 12.3 billion (US$277.34 million).

Preparations and impact

Philippines
During October 9, PAGASA issued the public storm warning signal number 1 for the island province of Catanduanes, before expanding the areas under Signal 1 early the next day to include Aurora, Camarines Norte, Camarines Sur, Isabela, the Polilio Islands and Quezon. Later that day after the system had intensified into a typhoon and accelerated slightly towards the Philippines slightly, PAGASA placed 17 areas in Luzon under Signal 1, 14 areas under Signal 2 and Aurora Province under Signal 3. During October 11, the areas under signal 3 were expanded to include Benguet, Ifugao, Ilocos Sur, Isabela, La Union, Pangasinan, Polilio Island, Quirino, Nueva Ecija and Tarlac. Over the next day, the warnings were gradually revised before they were all subsequently cancelled during October 12, as the system moved out of the Philippine Area of Responsibility and was moving towards Vietnam.

Within the Philippines a total of 15 people were left dead while 5 were missing, while total economic losses were amounted to be PHP3.3 billion (US$77 million).

Vietnam

In advance of the typhoon, more than 122,000 residents were evacuated from vulnerable provinces to higher grounds. In Danang, soldiers were sent to help people readily secure their homes against the expected winds and guide ships to shelter. Thousands of travelers were left stranded as Vietnam Airlines cancelled over a dozen flights. 
In total Nari caused 26 deaths and economic losses of 4,315 billion VND (US$204.5 million, 2013)

Laos
On October 16, poor weather from the remnants of Typhoon Nari has been cited as a probable cause for the crash of Lao Airlines Flight 301, on approach to Pakse International Airport with the loss of all 49 passengers and crew. Another 4 people were killed directly due to the storm.

China
Total damages in China were counted to be CN¥50 million (US$8.19 million).

Retirement
PAGASA announced that the name Santi, would be retired from its naming lists after it had caused over ₱1 billion in damages. PAGASA chose the name Salome to replace Santi for the 2017 season.

See also

Typhoon Vongfong (2020)
Tropical Depression 18W (2013)
Typhoon Ketsana
Typhoon Mirinae (2009)
Typhoon Xangsane
Typhoon Wutip (2013)
Typhoon Vamco
Typhoon Noru

References

External links

JMA General Information of Typhoon Nari (1325) from Digital Typhoon
JMA Best Track Data of Typhoon Nari (1325) 
JTWC Best Track Data  of Typhoon 24W (Nari)
24W.NARI  from the U.S. Naval Research Laboratory

2013 Pacific typhoon season
2013 disasters in the Philippines
Typhoons in the Philippines
Typhoons in Vietnam
Typhoons in Laos
Typhoons
Nari